Hidden Valley High School is a public high school in Roanoke County, Virginia. It is one of the five high schools in the Roanoke County Public Schools system. The other four high schools which serve Roanoke County are Cave Spring High School, Glenvar High School, Northside High School and William Byrd High School.

History

Hidden Valley High School was opened for the 2002–03 school year by Roanoke County public schools in response to overcrowding at Cave Spring High School. Enrollment at Cave Spring was limited to grades 10–12 in contrast to the contemporary educational preference to house grades 6–8 in middle school and grades 9–12 in high school. Hidden Valley was the first new high school opened in the immediate Roanoke Valley because of increased enrollment since the 1960s. There was significant debate about whether to split Cave Spring's student population into two schools or keep it intact in a renovated or newly constructed building because of the school's well-regarded reputation in academics. Eventually, Roanoke County decided to build a second high school for southwest county.

The name Hidden Valley was selected to correspond to Hidden Valley Middle School in southwest county. Woods End, the designation for the tract of land, was also considered for the new school's name. The incoming student population selected the nickname Titans in response to the film Remember the Titans which dramatized the 1971 state-championship football team from T. C. Williams High School of Alexandria, Virginia which was released two years earlier.

Academics

Hidden Valley High School is a comprehensive high school which includes grades 9–12 with a student enrollment of 1,211. The school offers courses in multiple academic disciplines including Advanced Placement courses. The core classes provided include English, social studies, health/PE, math, and science. Specialty classes are also provided and include art, business, computer science, foreign language, marketing, music, technology education, and theater arts. Specialized arts and vocational education is available at places like Arnold R. Burton Technology Center in Salem, or the Roanoke Valley Governor's School for Science and Technology in Roanoke. Pass rates for Virginia's Standards of Learning tests average over 90%, which makes the school fully accredited.
Hidden Valley High formerly housed the Specialty Center for Mass Communications, until it was moved to The Burton Center for Art and Technology in the 2006–07 school year.

Statistics
Enrollment:
 292 freshmen
 247 sophomores
 293 juniors
 177 seniors  
Lunch programs:
 4% of the students are eligible for free lunches
 3% are eligible for reduced price lunches

Athletics

In 2003–04, Hidden Valley's men's varsity tennis team won its first state championship by defeating the Blacksburg Bruins. Hidden Valley has had a relatively successful tennis program every year since.

Band programs

Approximately 20% of the student body are involved in band programs at the school. There are three instrumental music classes during the school day: the concert band, symphonic band, and the wind ensemble. The three bands have earned an "Excellent" and "Superior" at the annual Virginia Band and Orchestra Directors Association (VBODA) concert festival. Also provided are morning and afternoon jazz bands, a morning instrumental ensemble (cancelled in 2010–11 due to under-enrollment), and the school's "Mighty Titan Marching Band". The marching band consists of over 200 members, a Class 5A band, and is one of the largest in the state. It has earned both "Excellent" and "Superior" ratings at the annual VBODA marching festival, including a "Superior" from all 5 judges in 2006. Other musical programs offered by the school include music theory and choir.

Mr. Barry Tucker, previous director of bands and teacher at Roanoke County Schools for almost three decades, stepped down from the head director position to take the position of Coordinator of Music/Performing Arts for the Roanoke County School System. His previous assistant, Mr. Glen Gray, became music director at Hidden Valley High School in the 2007–08 school year, but resigned after the 2009–10 year due to family health problems. Mr. Gray's assistant director, Mr. Dustin McCollum, then took over the position as head director.

Hidden Valley High School's choir has performed in the Disney World Candlelight Processional in 2003–2007, 2009 and 2010. Various members of the choir also sang backup for Bob Carlisle when he came to Roanoke for a small performance in November 2004.

Clubs

The Hidden Valley High School has a variety of clubs for students to join. These clubs include Archery Club, Beta Club, Drama Club, Debate Club, SCA, TSA, DECA,  FCCLA, FCA, French Club, German Club, Latin Club, Key Club, Bible Study Club, Science Club, Green Club, Students for Life Club, Math Club, Dance Team, Young Republicans, Diversity Club, and Spirit Club, Tabletop and Board Game Club, and Amateur Radio Club. Their yearbook program has won the state title and has placed nationally every year the school has been open. Last year the program was nominated for a Pacemaker Award, and took second place in the CSPA Crown Category. Clubs must be sponsored by a teacher or staff member.

References

External links
 
 Virginia Department of Education Report Card 
 Great Schools site

Public high schools in Virginia
Educational institutions established in 2002
Schools in Roanoke County, Virginia
2002 establishments in Virginia